St Margaret's School may refer to:

Australia 
St Margaret's School, Melbourne
St Margaret's Anglican Girls' School, Brisbane

Brunei 
 St. Margaret's School, Brunei

Canada 
 St. Margaret's School (Victoria, British Columbia)

China 
 St. Margaret's Co-educational English Secondary and Primary School, Hong Kong

Singapore 
 St. Margaret's Primary School
 St. Margaret's Secondary School

United Kingdom 
 St Margaret's Primary School, Horsforth, England
 St Margaret's School, Bushey, Hertfordshire, England
 St Margaret's School, Edinburgh, Scotland
 St Margaret's School for Girls, Aberdeen, Scotland
 St Margaret's School Hampstead, London

United States 
 St. Margaret's Episcopal School, California
 Saint Margaret School (Pearl River, New York)
 St. Margaret of Cortona School, the Bronx, New York
 St. Margaret's School (Virginia)

See also 
 St Margaret's Academy, Livingston, West Lothian, Scotland
 St Margaret's Church of England Academy, Liverpool, England
 St Margaret's College (disambiguation)
 St. Margaret's Junior College, Tokyo, Japan
 Benilde-St. Margaret's, St. Louis Park, Minnesota, United States